Jeffrey David Matheson (born 30 March 1948) is a former New Zealand rugby union player and coach. A prop, Matheson represented Otago and North Otago at a provincial level, and was a member of the New Zealand national side, the All Blacks, in 1972. He played 13 matches for the All Blacks including five internationals. He later coached North Otago between 1977 and 1980 and was a technical advisor to the Sri Lankan national team from 1990 to 1994.

References

1948 births
Living people
People from Palmerston, New Zealand
People educated at Waitaki Boys' High School
New Zealand rugby union players
New Zealand international rugby union players
Otago rugby union players
North Otago rugby union players
Rugby union props
New Zealand rugby union coaches
New Zealand expatriate sportspeople in Sri Lanka